Solstorm (en: Sunstorm) is a Swedish thriller/drama film released in 2007. It was filmed in Kiruna and was released in cinema on November 2, 2007. The film is based on the novel Sun Storm written by author Åsa Larsson.

Synopsis 
Stockholm attorney Rebecka Martinsson (Izabella Scorupco) receives a call from a childhood friend, telling her that her brother has been murdered inside a church in the village of Kurravaara outside Kiruna. Martinsson returns to her home town in Kiruna and gets involved in the search for the killer.

Cast
Izabella Scorupco - Rebecka Martinsson
Maria Sundbom - Sanna Strandgård
Saga Larsson - Lova Strandgård
Sandra Engström - Sara Strandgård
Mikael Persbrandt - Thomas Söderberg
Suzanne Reuter - Kristina Strandgård
Krister Henriksson - Olof Strandgård
Jakob Eklund - Måns Wenngren
André Sjöberg - Viktor Strandgård
Lena B. Eriksson - Anna-Maria Mella
Göran Forsmark - Sven-Erik Stålnacke
Antti Reini - Vesa Larsson

External links

2007 films
Swedish thriller drama films
Films based on Swedish novels
2007 thriller drama films
2007 drama films
2000s Swedish films